Daniel, Danny or Dan Goldman may refer to:

Danny Goldman (1939–2020), American actor and casting director
Daniel Ivan Goldman (born 1972), American experimental physicist
Dan Goldman (comics) (born 1974), American writer, artist and producer
Dan Goldman (politician) (born 1976), American attorney and legal analyst; U.S. Representative from New York
Daniel Goldman, American actor and 2007 winner at 28th Young Artist Awards